Combat flight simulators are vehicle simulation games, amateur flight simulation computer programs used to simulate military aircraft and their operations. These are distinct from dedicated flight simulators used for professional pilot and military flight training which consist of realistic physical recreations of the actual aircraft cockpit, often with a full-motion platform.

Combat flight simulation titles are more numerous than civilian flight simulators due to the variety of subject matter available and market demand. Many free flight simulators, such as the open source Linux Air Combat, Falcon 4.0, Digital Combat Simulator and Rise of Flight, can be downloaded for free off the Internet.

History

1970s
Prior to the rise of modern-day video games, electro-mechanical games (EM games) were produced that used rear image projection in a manner similar to a zoetrope to produce moving animations on a screen. This technology led to the rise of flight simulation arcade games, initially in the form of EM games. One such EM game was Jet Rocket, a flight simulator released by Sega in 1970 that featured cockpit controls that could move the player's aircraft around a landscape displayed on a screen and shoot missiles at targets that would explode when hit. The game displayed three-dimensional terrain with buildings, produced using special belt technology along with fluorescent paint to simulate a night view. Upon its debut, the game was cloned by three Chicago arcade manufacturers, which led to the game under-performing in North America. Sega released several other similar EM flight combat games, including Dive Bomber (1971) and Air Attack (1972).

Combat flight simulator video games began appearing from the late 1970s. In 1975, Taito released the arcade video game simulator Interceptor, an early first-person combat flight simulator that involved piloting a jet fighter using an eight-way joystick to aim and shoot at enemy aircraft.

Sega's last EM combat flight simulator was Heli-Shooter (1977), which combines the use of a CPU processor with electro-mechanical components, screen projection and audio tape deck. The gameplay involves the player piloting a helicopter using a throttle joystick (to accelerate and decelerate) and pedals (to maneuver left and right) across a realistic three-dimensional landscape and shooting at military targets across the landscape. In Japan, it was one of the top ten highest-grossing EM arcade games of 1977, and it released in North America the same year.

1980s
The 1980s experienced a wave of more advanced simulation video games, with companies such as Atari Inc. releasing their own game called Red Baron in 1980, which used QuadraScan graphics and sound effects to simulate first-person flight combat. Other games such as the earliest version of Microsoft Flight Simulator (1982) had crude graphics, simple flight models, and a combat option with "dog fighting" in a World War I Sopwith Camel. Shortly after Microsoft Flight Simulator was released for the 8-bit computer, Microsoft released Jet in 1985. This simulator used simple filled wire frame graphics and a small generic battle space to allow players to fight MiGs in an F-18 or F-16. There were also titles released for the Atari 2600 that simulated flight combat, two examples being Mattel's Air Raiders (1982) and Milton Bradley's Spitfire Attack (1983).

Later in the 1980s, it became a trend for arcade flight combat simulators to use hydraulic motion simulator arcade cabinets. The trend was sparked by Sega's "taikan" games, with "taikan" meaning "body sensation" in Japanese. Yu Suzuki's team at Sega (later known as Sega AM2) developed hydraulic motion simulator cockpit cabinets for flight combat games such as Space Harrier (1985), After Burner (1987) and the R360 games.

1990s–present
In the early 1990s, arcade flight combat simulators began adopting 3D polygon graphics. Taito's Air Inferno (1990) was a 3D flight simulator utilizing a motion simulator cockpit cabinet. Atari Games followed with the 3D flight combat simulator the following year, Steel Talons (1991). Namco then followed with the 3D arcade combat flight simulator Air Combat (1993).

During the 1990s to early 2000s, there was a transition from traditional video game platforms like arcades, to consoles such as the original PlayStation, for their ability to be played at home. PC games remained popular during this time, as many publishers continued to produce games primarily for the PC platform. Due to the limitations and the relative simplicity of the controllers available for gaming consoles at the time, flight simulators remained largely absent from consoles for years to come. Several rival publishers rose during this period such as NovaLogic with titles like the Comanche Series that simulated helicopter combat, and Electronic Arts with Jane's WWII Fighters which improved upon features such as detailed visible damage.

Newer software in the genre include Digital Combat Simulator (released in 2008 and mostly simulating modern aircraft), Rise of Flight (released in 2009 and set in World War I) and IL-2 Sturmovik: Cliffs of Dover (released in 2011 and set in World War II). These three are examples of accurate simulation PC games, as opposed to arcade-style air combat games such as Bandai Namco Entertainment's highly-successful Ace Combat series.

Types
Combat flight simulators are classified according to their historical period, type of aircraft, and level of detail. This method of classifying means that many simulators belong to more than one category, which leads to arguments about what can be considered actual simulations instead of games. Generally, simulations are expected to be imitations of real-world technology, while games are not; therefore, every game with flying in them does not fit into the category of "flight simulation."

Simulator realism can be classified as the following:
 Arcade game (least realistic)
 Survey simulation
 Study simulation (most realistic)

Arcade
Arcade-style combat flight simulators have various elements that are less realistic than other simulators, such as simplified controls and physics models, compressed or non-existent start up times, emphasis on close-range dogfighting over beyond-visual-range combat for modern jets, and the ability to carry a physically impossible amount of weapons compared to real-life aircraft loadouts. Examples of console or PC games include Ace Combat, H.A.W.X., and Project Wingman.

Many arcade combat flight simulators in amusement arcades are housed in cockpit arcade cabinets that use motion simulator technology, often incorporating hydraulics. Popular examples include the original arcade versions of After Burner, Thunder Blade and Air Combat. Sega's R360 motion simulator cabinet notably features full 360-degree rotation, used by the arcade games G-LOC: Air Battle and Wing War.

Survey
A survey simulation is a classification of simulator that includes a variety (or survey) of aircraft from the period in question. This type of classification applies to many historical combat simulators, and typically includes aircraft from all nations participating in the conflict. Early simulators suffered from flight models and instrument panels that differed little between aircraft. As the technology got better, so did the diversity of aircraft, which forced the virtual pilot to learn the carefully modelled strengths and weaknesses of the various types of aircraft (e.g. the different fighting and flying styles of a Spitfire versus a Messerschmitt 109 in IL-2 Sturmovik or a Mitsubishi Zero versus a US Navy F4F Wildcat in Combat Flight Simulator 2).

Modern jet survey simulators have been developed as well, such as US Navy Fighters (USNF) and Jane's USAF by Jane's/Electronic Arts, typically with simplified and generic modelling of radar, navigation, and weapons. The turn of the century saw advancements in technology that increased the capabilities of these simulators, simplifying and improving their weapon handling and flight models, as well as updated visuals. Titles featuring these improvements include Jane's Combat Simulations, a line of flight simulations originally developed by Electronic Arts and later continued by the company Third Wire, as well as the series Strike Fighters: Project 1 and Wings over Europe.

Study
The "study sim" is a genre of simulation games that focuses on modelling an aircraft's systems as accurately as possible. Advancing computer technology made this possible, with the development of highly detailed models that improved upon the fidelity of avionics, weapons systems, physics, flight models, graphics, etc. and allowed for fully interactive cockpits where virtually every control was mapped and functional. This was important as modern jet combat aircraft and helicopters have a variety of complex electronic and weapon systems that are specific to a particular aircraft.

Early iterations of simulators in this genre include the release of EF2000 by Digital Image Design (DiD) which quickly garnered a dedicated following, including a user group that produced a detailed online manual of weapons and tactics, as well as the popular Falcon 4.0, a detailed simulation of the USAF F-16 Fighting Falcon. Other development of these simulators includes a collaborative and specialized effort between Electronic Arts and Jane's in the 1990s, with titles such as Jane's Longbow, Jane's Longbow 2, Jane's F-15 and Jane's F/A-18.

Helicopter simulations began in 1986 with the title Gunship by MicroProse. Nine years later, in 1995, Digital Integration Ltd. released Apache Longbow, the most sophisticated helicopter simulation of the time. In 1996 it was exceeded by Jane's AH-64D Longbow, a game created by Origin Systems and released by Electronic Arts as part of the Jane's Combat Simulator series. The sequel, Jane's Longbow 2 (1997), was one of the earliest simulations to take advantage of hardware accelerated graphics, including advanced lighting. 1998 saw the release of Enemy Engaged: Apache vs Havoc by Empire Interactive, which allowed players to choose to fly for either the US or Russia.

The sophistication and intricacy of these simulators continued to grow, and in 2008 the Digital Combat Simulator (DCS) released DCS: Black Shark, the first of a series of simulations that featured a complete and detailed cockpit with all the relevant switches accurately modelled and functional, and mapped over 500 key-commands. DCS also supported a variety of input devices aside from the traditional joystick, throttle, and pedals, featuring built-in support for TrackIR and virtual reality with 6 degrees of freedom which, in conjunction with the interactive 3D-cockpit, created a very realistic experience.

Modern jet
Modern jet simulators are usually classified by their historical context or level of details (study versus survey). There have been many modern jet sims that concentrate on existing fighters (several AV-8 Harrier II sims, and others such as Fleet Defender by MicroProse, and F22 lightning 3 and F-22 Raptor by NovaLogic), whereas others concentrate on future fighters (e.g., F-22 Total Air War by Digital Image Design in 1998). While many simulators either classify as a study sim or a survey sim, Lock On: Modern Air Combat is an example of a game that attempts to bridge the study/survey gap with highly detailed models of several US and Russian aircraft.

Multi-player
Before multiplayer games became popular, many simulators could only be played by a single player. This continued to be the standard until the late 1990s when most titles included some sort of multi-player/network capability. In single-player combat simulators, every entity other than the players' own aircraft are controlled by the program's "AI" (artificial intelligence), and modern video games create very sophisticated and intelligent AI with independent behavior for adversaries and allies. Multiplayer games, which usually also contain AI, allow players to oppose one or many human players. After the growth of the internet, many simulators were created that exist only or primarily as internet multiplayer versions (e.g., Air Warrior, the massively multiplayer Fighter Ace, WarBirds, Aces High, World War II Online, Ace Online, War Thunder, Fighter Wing 2 and others).

Gameplay

Missions, campaigns, mission builders
Many players of both video games and simulators seek games for their replay value. Simulators enhance the replay value by offering a variety of single missions consisting of short, randomly generated missions as well as longer campaigns consisting of several smaller mission or objectives. Most campaigns are "dynamic flowing," which means they change according to the results of each successive mission (e.g. if the player destroys a "target of opportunity" which turns out to be a truck carrying an enemy leader, then the campaign starts to take a different path). Some campaign models have been developed which are fully dynamic, and where successive missions take place in an environment which is persistent (if a building is destroyed in one mission, it remains destroyed in the next and will only be rebuilt in view of limited resources, realistic time and strategic priorities, etc.). A notable pioneer in this area was Andy Hollis, producer of the Jane's Longbow series (Jane's AH-64D Longbow and Jane's Longbow 2). Digital Image Design, with their release of F-22 Total Air War in 1998, allowed for a transparency into the larger strategic battlefield by use of multiple screens and a "God's eye view." Many simulators also include "mission builders" which allow the player to create their own missions.

Controls and other hardware
Combat flight simulators are among the most computer and graphics demanding applications at any given time, as they are real-time applications with multiple processes happening at once. This leads many simulation fans to constantly upgrade their hardware, including the most advanced graphics cards. These sims have also given rise to a variety of hardware add-ons such as "HOTAS" (hands on throttle and stick) controllers that allow full control of most functions without touching the keyboard. Voice control and head-tracking view control systems are also available for home flight sim enthusiasts.

Titles 
The tables below define rough guidelines of what might classify as combat flight simulation games.

World War I

World War II

Korean War

Vietnam War

Modern
{| class="wikitable sortable"
|-
! Title !! Publisher/Developer !! Year !! Type !! Notes
|-
|Fighter Pilot || Digital Integration Ltd.|| 1983 || || F-15 Sim
|-
|F-15 Strike Eagle || MicroProse || 1985 || ||
|-
|Jet (video game) || subLOGIC || 1985 || ||
|-
|Jump Jet / Harrier Mission || Anirog Software Ltd.|| 1985 || ||
|-
|Tomahawk || Digital Integration Ltd.|| 1985 || || AH-64 Sim
|-
|Falcon || Spectrum HoloByte || 1987 || ||
|-
|F/A-18 Interceptor || Electronic Arts || 1988 || ||
|-
|F-19 Stealth Fighter || MicroProse || 1988 || ||
|-
|F-15 Strike Eagle II || MicroProse || 1989 || ||
|-
|F-16 Combat Pilot || Digital Integration Ltd.|| 1989 || ||
|-
|Fighter Bomber || Vektor Grafix || 1989 || || Released as Strike Aces in the USA
|-
|F29 Retaliator || DID || 1989 || || The F29 is a fictional fighter jet.
|-
|Apache Strike || Activision || 1989 || ||
|-
|A-10 Tank Killer || Dynamix || 1990 || ||
|-
|Chocks Away || The Fourth Dimension || 1990 || ||
|-
|Falcon 3.0 || Spectrum Holobyte || 1991 || ||
|-
|F-22 Interceptor || Ingram Entertainment || 1991 || ||
|-
|F-117A Nighthawk Stealth Fighter 2.0 || Microprose || 1991 || ||
|-
|LHX || Electronic Arts || 1991 || ||
|-
|Top Gun: Danger Zone || Konami || 1991 || ||
|-
|Birds of Prey || Electronic Arts || 1991 || ||
|-
|Chuck Yeager's Air Combat || Electronic Arts || 1991 || ||
|-
|AV-8B Harrier Assault || Domark || 1992 || ||
|-
|Harrier Jump Jet (video game) || MicroProse || 1992 || ||
|-
|Air Combat || Namco || 1993 || Arcade||Arcade video game
|-
|Combat Air Patrol || Psygnosis || 1993 || ||
|-
|F-15 Strike Eagle III || MicroProse || 1993 || ||
|-
|Tornado || Digital Integration Ltd.|| 1993 || ||
|-
|TFX || DID || 1993 || ||
|-
|Dogfight || MicroProse || 1993 || ||
|-
|Fleet Defender || MicroProse || 1994 || ||
|-
|Strike Commander || Origin Systems || 1994 || Arcade ||
|-
|Comanche || Novalogic || 1994 || ||
|-
|Flying Nightmares || Domark Software, Inc. || 1994 || || Harrier Sim
|-
|EF2000 || DID || 1995 || ||
|-
|Apache Longbow || Digital Integration Ltd.|| 1995 || ||
|-
|Su-27 Flanker || Eagle Dynamics || 1995 || ||
|-
|A-10 Attack! || Parsoft Interactive || 1995 || ||
|-
|Air Combat || Namco || 1995 || Arcade||PlayStation console game
|-
|Coala || Empire Interactive || 1995 || ||
|-
|Comanche || Novalogic || 1995 || ||
|-
|F-22 Lightning II || Novalogic || 1996 || ||
|-
|Jane's AH-64D Longbow || Jane's Combat Simulations || 1996 || ||
|-
|A-10 Cuba! || Activision || 1996 || ||
|-
|Bogey Dead 6 || SCEE || 1996 || ||
|-
|iF-16 || Digital Integration Ltd.|| 1996 || ||
|-
|Ace Combat 2 || Namco || 1997 || Arcade ||
|-
|Jane's Fighters Anthology || Electronic Arts || 1997 || ||
|-
|JSF || Eidos || 1997 || ||
|-
|Hind || Digital Integration Ltd.|| 1997 || ||
|-
|F/A-18 Korea || Graphic Simulations Corporation|| 1997 || ||
|-
|F-22 Raptor || NovaLogic || 1997 || ||
|-
|F-22: Air Dominance Fighter || DID || 1997 || ||
|-
|iF-22 Raptor || Magic Labs|| 1997 || ||
|-
|Jane's Longbow 2 || Jane's Combat Simulations || 1997 || ||
|-
|Comanche 3 || Novalogic || 1997 || ||
|-
|Jane's F-15 || Jane's Combat Simulations || 1998 || ||
|-
|Jane's IAF: Israeli Air Force || Jane's Combat Simulations || 1998 || ||
|-
|Falcon 4.0 || MicroProse || 1998 || ||
|-
|Enemy Engaged: Apache vs Havoc || Razorworks || 1998 || ||
|-
|Aero Fighters Assault || Paradigm Entertainment || 1998 || ||
|-
|Comanche Gold || Novalogic || 1998 || ||
|-
|Hell-Copter || Ubisoft || 1998 || ||
|-
|Mig-29 Fulcrum || Novalogic || 1998 || ||
|-
|Ace Combat 3: Electrosphere || Namco || 1999 || Arcade ||
|-
|F-22 Lightning 3 || NovaLogic || 1999 || ||
|-
|Jane's F/A-18 || Jane's Combat Simulations || 1999 || ||
|-
|F/A-18E Super Hornet || Titus Interactive/Digital Integration Ltd.|| 2000 || ||
|-
|AeroWings 2: Airstrike || Crave Entertainment and CRI || 2000 || ||
|-
|Airforce Delta || Konami || 2000 || ||
|-
|Gunship! || MicroProse/Hasbro || 2000 || ||
|-
|Ace Combat 04: Shattered Skies || Namco || 2001 || Arcade ||
|-
|Eurofighter Typhoon || DID || 2001 || ||
|-
|Comanche 4 || Novalogic || 2001 || ||
|-
|Flanker 2.5 || Eagle Dynamics || 2002 || ||
|-
|Aces of the Air || Highwaystar || 2002 || ||
|-
|AirForce Delta Storm || Konami || 2002 || ||
|-
|Lock On: Modern Air Combat || Eagle Dynamics || 2003 || ||
|-
|F/A-18 Operation Iraqi Freedom || Graphsim Entertainment|| 2003 || ||
|-
|Ace Combat 5: The Unsung War || Namco || 2004 || Arcade ||
|-
|Airforce Delta Strike || Konami || 2004 || ||
|-
|Falcon 4.0: Allied Force || Lead Pursuit|| 2005 || ||
|-
|Ace Combat Zero: The Belkan War || Namco || 2006 || Arcade ||
|-
|Red Jets || Graffiti Entertainment || 2006 || ||
|-
|Wings Over Europe || Third Wire Productions || 2006 || ||
|-
|Ace Combat 6: Fires of Liberation || Namco || 2007 || Arcade ||
|-
|Strike Fighters 2 || Third Wire Productions || 2008 || ||
|-
|Digital Combat Simulator||Eagle Dynamics|| 2008 || Study ||
|-
|H.A.W.X || Ubisoft || 2009 || Arcade ||
|-
|H.A.W.X 2 || Ubisoft || 2010 || Arcade ||
|-
|Apache: Air Assault || Gaijin Entertainment || 2010 || ||
|-
|Take On Helicopters: Hinds || Bohemia Interactive || 2012 || ||
|-
|Strike Fighters 2: North Atlantic || Third Wire Productions || 2012 || ||
|-
|Air Missions: HIND || 3DIVISION/Games Farm|| 2016 || ||
|-
|VTOL VR || Boundless Dynamics, LLC. 
|| 2017 || ||Uses near futuristic aircraft while maintaining realism
|-
|Ace Combat 7: Skies Unknown || Namco || 2019 || Arcade ||
|-
|Project Wingman || Sector D2 / Humble Games || 2020 || Arcade ||
|-
|}

References

 External links 

 MiGMan's Flight Sim Museum'', video game flight simulators from the 1970s to the present day

 
Video game genres